The Old Soul was a Canadian indie rock band formed in 2003 in Toronto.  The ensemble was founded and led by Luca Maoloni, initially as a solo project. They perform an eclectic variety of instruments and styles, with critics drawing comparisons with Broken Social Scene the Polyphonic Spree. In Torontonian circles, they are known for live lyrical and musical variations on album standards.

History
Maoloni studied piano at The Royal Conservatory of Music in Toronto, and went on to complete a degree in Music Theory and Composition at the University of Western Ontario. In 1988 he completed aMusic Industry Arts collegiate degree in recording. Prior to The Old Soul, he was a member of Hollowphonic and White Star Line.

The self-titled debut album was released in 2004 (and reissued two years later by Universal), and followed in 2006 with She's Got Party Davis Eyes. Third album Gold was released in 2007.

Discography
The Old Soul (2004), Hand of God
She's Got Party Davis Eyes (2006), Hand of God
Gold (2007), Grifter

References

External links
The Old Soul official website
The Old Soul at Myspace
The Old Soul at CBC Radio 3
Review by Eye Weekly

Musical groups established in 2003
Musical groups disestablished in 2008
Canadian indie rock groups
2003 establishments in Ontario
2008 disestablishments in Ontario